Lingti, also Lindi or Lindixiang is a small town and township-level division of Lhari County in the Nagqu Prefecture of the Tibet Autonomous Region, in China. As of 2004 it had a population of about 1100. 
The principal economic activity is animal husbandry, pastoral yak, goat, sheep, and so on. The town's name means "forest embankment".

Administrative divisions
The township-level division contains the following villages:

Lindi Village (林堤村) 	
Qiacha Village	(恰查村) 	
Wosuo Village	(沃索村) 	
Jiangjiu Village	 (江久村) 	
Palongba Village (帕隆巴村) 	
Yangre Village	(央热村) 	
Cangkang Village (仓康村)

See also
List of towns and villages in Tibet

References

Township-level divisions of Tibet
Populated places in Nagqu
Lhari County